Graham Masterton (born 16 January 1946, in Edinburgh) is a British author known primarily for horror fiction. Originally editor of Mayfair and the British edition of Penthouse, his debut novel, The Manitou, was published in 1976. This novel was adapted in 1978 for the film The Manitou. His 1978 novel Charnel House and 1983 novel Tengu garnered positive critical reception, the former receiving a Special Edgar Award by the Mystery Writers of America and the latter being awarded with a silver medal by the West Coast Review of Books. Masterton is also the only non-French winner of the prestigious Prix Julia Verlanger for his novel Family Portrait, a reworking of the Oscar Wilde novel The Picture of Dorian Gray. Masterton was also the editor of Scare Care, a horror anthology published for the benefit of abused children in Europe and the United States.

Masterton's novels often contain visceral sex and horror. In addition to his novels, Masterton has written a number of sex instruction books, including How To Drive Your Man Wild in Bed and Wild Sex for New Lovers.

In 2002, Masterton wrote the crime novel A Terrible Beauty, featuring the character Katie Maguire, an Irish detective. The novel was republished in 2013 under the title White Bones, and spawned a number of other novels by Masterson featuring the Maguire character. In 2010, Masterton published Rules of Duel, a short novel that he co-wrote with William S. Burroughs in the early 1970s.

Career

Masterson is a former editor of Mayfair and the British edition of Penthouse. His first novel, The Manitou, was published in 1976, and adapted in 1978 for the film The Manitou. Further works garnered critical acclaim, including a Special Edgar Award by the Mystery Writers of America for Charnel House and a silver medal by the West Coast Review of Books for Tengu. He is also the only non-French winner of the prestigious Prix Julia Verlanger for his novel Family Portrait, a reworking of the Oscar Wilde novel The Picture of Dorian Gray. Masterton was also the editor of Scare Care, a horror anthology published for the benefit of abused children in Europe and the U.S.

In 2002, while living with his wife in Cork, Ireland, Masterton added crime fiction to his repertoire with A Terrible Beauty featuring Irish Detective Superintendent Katie Maguire. This was republished in 2013 as White Bones and sold 100,000 ebook copies in a month. It is to be followed by further Katie Maguire adventures,  Broken Angels (2013),  Red Light (2014), "Taken For Dead" (2014), "Blood Sisters" (2015), "Buried" (2015), Living Death" (2016), "Dead Girls Dancing" (2016) and "Dead Men Whistling" (2018). In 2010, Masterton published Rules of Duel, a short novel from the early 1970s that he wrote in collaboration with William S. Burroughs (Burroughs has co-author credit).

In 2017, after a visit to Wolow, the maximum-security prison near Wrocław in southern Poland, Masterton set up the Graham Masterton Written in Prison Award (Nagroda Grahama Mastertona W Wiezieniu Pisane) for the inmates of all of Poland's penal institutions to enter a short story contest. The contest is now an annual event and is supported by the Polish Prison Service, the Wrocław Agglomeration for Culture and Sport, both Rebis and Albatros publishing houses and the Wrocław Library.

The Prix Graham Masterton is organized annually in Belgium by the publisher Marc Bailly for the best French horror novel and short story of the year. The first prize is a sculpture of a demon.

In 2019, Masterton was given a Lifetime Achievement Award by the Horror Writers' Association. In 2021, he was honoured by the city of Wrocław in Poland by having a bronze dwarf representing himself with a copy of his horror novel The Manitou placed on the pavement outside the Art Hotel on Kielbasnicza Street -- one of nearly 600 dwarves which are a major tourist attraction.

Personal life
Masterton lives in Surrey, England. His wife and agent Wiescka died on 27 April 2011, aged 65.

Bibliography

Horror
The Djinn (featuring Harry Erskine of The Manitou series), 1977
The Sphinx, 1978
Charnel House, 1978
The Devils of D-Day, 1978
The Hell Candidate, 1981
The Heirloom, 1981
The Wells of Hell (loosely based on H. P. Lovecraft's short story "The Colour Out of Space"), 1981
Tengu, 1983
The Pariah, 1983
Picture of Evil (based on Oscar Wilde's novel The Picture of Dorian Gray; also published in the U.K. as Family Portrait), 1985
Death Trance, 1986
Mirror (referencing Lewis Carroll's Through the Looking-Glass), 1988
Feast (also published in the U.K. as Ritual), 1988
Walkers, 1989
Master of Lies (also published in the U.K. as Black Angel; mentions Harry Erskine as a fictional character), 1991
The Burning (also published in the U.K. as The Hymn), 1991
Prey (based on H. P. Lovecraft's short story "The Dreams in the Witch House"), 1992
The Sleepless, 1993
Flesh & Blood, 1994
Spirit (referencing Hans Christian Andersen's The Snow Queen), 1995
The House That Jack Built, 1995
The Chosen Child, 1996
House of Bones, 1998
The Doorkeepers, 2001
Hair Raiser, 2001
Trauma (also published in the U.K. as Bonnie Winter), 2001
The Hidden World, 2003
The Devil in Gray, 2004
Unspeakable, 2004
Descendant (the first book of a proposed series called Vampire Hunter), 2006
Edgewise, 2006
The 5th Witch, 2008
Ghost Music, 2008
Fire Spirit, 2010
Panic (also published in the U.K. as Forest Ghost), 2013
Community, 2014
Scarlet Widow, 2015
The House of a Hundred Whispers, 2020

The Manitou/Harry Erskine series
The Manitou, 1976
The Djinn, 1977
Revenge of the Manitou, 1979
Burial, 1991
"Spirit Jump" (short story in Faces of Fear), 1996
Manitou Blood, 2005
Blind Panic, 2009
Plague of the Manitou, 2015

Night Warriors series
Night Warriors, 1987
Death Dream, 1988
Night Plague, 1991
Night Wars, 2006
The Ninth Nightmare, 2011

Rook series
Rook, 1997
Tooth and Claw, 1997
The Terror, 1998
Snowman, 1999
Swimmer, 2001
Darkroom, 2004
Demon's Door, 2010
Garden of Evil, 2012

Sissy Sawyer series
Touchy and Feely (also published as Ill Fortune, loosely based on the Beltway snipers), 2005
The Painted Man (also published as Death Mask), 2008
The Red Hotel, 2012

Nathan Underhill series
Basilisk, 2009
Petrified, 2011

Katie Maguire series
 1.  White Bones (also published as Katie Maguire and A Terrible Beauty), 2003
 2.  Broken Angels (also published as Voice of an Angel), 2012
 3.  Red Light, 2014
 4.  Taken for Dead, 2014
 5.  Blood Sisters, 2015
 5.5 "Eye for an Eye" (short story), 2015
 6.  Buried, 2016
 7.  Living Death, 2016
 7.5 "The Drowned" (short story), 2016
 8.  Dead Girls Dancing, 2016
 9.  Dead Men Whistling, 2018
 10. Begging to Die, 2019
 11. The Last Drop of Blood, 2020

Historical fiction
Heartbreaker (published as by Katherine Winston), 1978
Rich, 1979
Railroad (also published as Man of Destiny), 1981
Solitaire, 1982
Corroboree, 1984
Maiden Voyage, 1984
Lady of Fortune, 1984
Headlines, 1986
Silver, 1987
Lords of the Air, 1988
Empress, 1990

Thrillers
Fireflash 5 (also published as A Mile Before Morning), 1977
Plague, 1977
The Sweetman Curve, 1979
Famine, 1981
Ikon, 1983
Condor, 1984
Sacrifice, 1985
Genius (also published as Kingdom of the Blind), 1998
Holy Terror (also published as Plague of Terror), 1999
Innocent Blood (also published as Outrage), 2004
Chaos Theory, 2007
Rules of Duel (co-credited to William S. Burroughs), 2010 (written between 1964 and 1970)
Drought, 2014

Confessions series
Confessions of a Wanton Waitress, 1975
Confessions of a Racy Receptionist, 1976

Movie tie-ins
Inserts (as Anton Rimart), 1976
Phobia (as Thomas Luke), 1980

...of Fear - short story collections
Fortnight of Fear, 1994
Flights of Fear, 1995
Faces of Fear, 1996
Feelings of Fear, 2000
Festival of Fear, 2005
Figures of Fear, 2014

Short stories
"Absence of Beast"
"Anaïs"
"Anka"
"A Polite Murder"
A Portrait of Kasia
"The Ballyhooly Boy"
"Beijing Craps"
"Beholder"
"Bridal Suite"
"The Burgers of Calais"
"Camelot"
"Changeling"
"Cold Turkey"
"Eau Noire"
"Edgewise" (also published as "Night of the Wendigo"; short story not directly related to the novel of the same name, although it features the character of John Shooks, serialized in issues #3, 4 and 5 of The Horror Express magazine, edited by Marc Shemmans)
"Egg"
"Eric the Pie"
"Ever, Ever After"
"Evidence of Angles"
"Fairy Story"
"5A Bedford Row"
"Friend in Need"
"The Grey Madonna"
"Grease Monkey"
"Grief"
"The Heart of Helen Day"
"Heart of Stone"
"Heroine"
"The Hungry Moon"
"Hurry Monster"
"I, The Martian"
"J.R.E. Ponsford"
"Jack Be Quick"
"The Jajouka Penis-Beetle"
"Laird of Dunain"
"Lolicia"
"Making Belinda"
"Men of Maes"
"Mother of Invention"
"Neighbors From Hell"
"Out of Her Depth"
"Picnic at Lac Du Sang"
"Pig's Dinner"
"Roadkill"
"Rococo"
"The Root of All Evil"
"Rug"
"Saint Joan"
"Saving Grace"
"The Scrawler"
"The Secret Shih-Tan"
"Sepsis"
"Sex Object"
"The Sixth Man"
"Son of Beast"
"Spirit Jump"
"Spirits of the Age"
"St. Bronach's Shrift"
"Suffer Kate"
"The Sympathy Society"
"The Taking of Mr. Bill"
"Underbed"
"Voodoo Child"
"Will" (Cthulhu Mythos pastiche; features Yog-Sothoth)
"The Woman in the Wall"

Sex instruction books
Acts of Love (published as by Dr. Jan Berghoff), 1971
Your Erotic Fantasies (published as by Edward Thorne), 1971
Girls Who Said Yes (published as by Edward Thorne), 1973
How a Woman Longs to be Loved (published as by Angel Smith), 1974
How to be the Perfect Lover, 1975
Isn't It Time You Did Something Kinky? (published as by Angel Smith), 1975
Sex is Everything (published as by Edward Thorne), 1975
How to be a Good Bad Girl (published as by Angel Smith), 1976
Women's Erotic Dreams (and What They Mean), 1976
1,001 Erotic Dreams Interpreted, 1976
How to Drive Your Man Wild in Bed, 1976
How to Drive Your Woman Wild in Bed, 1987
The High Intensity Sex Plan, 1977
More Ways to Drive Your Man Wild in Bed, 1985
Sex Secrets of the Other Woman, 1989
How to Drive Your Lover Wild in Bed (a combination of How to Drive Your Man Wild in Bed and How to Drive Your Woman Wild in Bed), 1989
How to Make Love Six Nights a Week, 1991
Wild in Bed Together, 1992
Drive Him Wild, 1993
Single, Wild, Sexy...and Safe, 1994
How to Drive Your Man Even Wilder in Bed, 1995
How to Make His Wildest Dreams Come True, 1996
Secrets of the Sexually Irresistible Woman, 1998
The Seven Secrets of Really Great Sex, 1999
The Secrets of Sexual Play, 1999
Wild Sex for New Lovers, 2001
Up All Night, 2004

References

External links

 Graham Masterton official website
 Official Polish website by Piotr Pocztarek
 Internet Movie Database entry for Graham Masterton

 

1946 births
20th-century British male writers
20th-century British non-fiction writers
20th-century British novelists
20th-century British short story writers
20th-century Scottish male writers
20th-century Scottish novelists
21st-century British male writers
21st-century British non-fiction writers
21st-century British novelists
21st-century British short story writers
21st-century Scottish male writers
21st-century Scottish novelists
Anthologists
British crime writers
British erotica writers
British historical fiction writers
British historical novelists
British horror writers
British male non-fiction writers
British male novelists
British male short story writers
British mystery writers
British speculative fiction writers
British thriller writers
Cthulhu Mythos writers
Ghost story writers
Living people
British psychological fiction writers
Scottish crime writers
Scottish historical novelists
Scottish horror writers
Scottish male novelists
Scottish mystery writers
Scottish non-fiction writers
Scottish short story writers
Scottish speculative fiction writers
Scottish thriller writers
Surrealist writers
Weird fiction writers
Writers from Edinburgh
Writers of Gothic fiction
Writers of historical fiction set in the early modern period
Writers of historical fiction set in the modern age
Writers of historical mysteries